Cove is an ancient village turned suburb, forming the western part of Farnborough in the county of Hampshire in the south-east of England. The appropriate ward is called Cove and Southwood. Cove is adjacent to Hawley village and Southwood.

History
Cove is mentioned in the Domesday Book. The entry from 1086, reads "Germanus holds from the Bishop 8 hides of this land in ITCHEL and COVE".

The Farnborough workhouse was located in Workhouse Lane, Cove (now known as Union street). This workhouse was built before 1832, was closed in 1868, sold in 1871 and demolished in the 1980s.  The building was named Wilmot House, after the lord of the manor.

Present day
Cove is now a suburb of Farnborough. Cove School is a secondary school located in the area. The local football team is Cove F.C.

Geology
The only naturally occurring water features that still exist in Cove are Cove Brook and Marrowbrook (which was once the outlet to the lake on Cove Common).  There was once a pond on Cove Green.

External links

 Cove old and new 880-1925

References 

Villages in Hampshire
Farnborough, Hampshire